is a village located in Nagano Prefecture, Japan. , the village had an estimated population of 9,051 in 3439 households, and a population density of 170 persons per km².

Geography
Miyada is located in the Kiso Mountains of central Nagano Prefecture, with Mount Kisokoma (2956 meters) within the village limits. The Tenryū River flows through the village.

Surrounding municipalities
Nagano Prefecture
 Komagane
 Ina
 Agematsu
 Kiso

Climate
Due to its location in the Kiso Mountains, the village has a climate characterized by characterized by cool summers and severely cold winters (Köppen climate classification Dfb).  The average annual temperature in Miyada is 5.5 °C. The average annual rainfall is 1974 mm with September as the wettest month. The temperatures are highest on average in August, at around 18.1 °C, and lowest in January, at around -6.6 °C.

Demographics 
Per Japanese census data, the population of Miyada has recently plateaued after a long period of growth.

History
The area of present-day Miyada was part of ancient Shinano Province and "Miyada" appears as a place name in the Heian period Engishiki. During the Edo period it was a post station n the Shio no Michi highway. The modern village was founded on September 30, 1956 by separating from the city of Komagane.

Education
Miyada has one public elementary school and one public middle school operated by the village government. The village does not have a high school.

Transportation

Railway
 Central Japan Railway Company -  Iida Line

Highway

References

External links

 Official Website 

 
Villages in Nagano Prefecture